Scrignac is a commune in the Finistère department of Brittany in north-western France.

Population
Inhabitants of Scrignac are called in French Scrignaciens.

See also
Communes of the Finistère department
Parc naturel régional d'Armorique

References

External links

Mayors of Finistère Association 

Communes of Finistère